Abracadabra is a 2017 Spanish-French fantasy black comedy-drama film written and directed by Pablo Berger. It stars Maribel Verdú, Antonio de la Torre & José Mota. It was shortlisted as one of the three films to be selected as the potential Spanish submission for the Academy Award for Best Foreign Language Film at the 90th Academy Awards. However, it was not selected, with Summer 1993 being selected as the Spanish entry.

Plot
Carmen (Verdú) is married to Carlos (De la Torre), a rude, emotionally abusive construction worker who barely pays any attention to his wife and teenage daughter. One night, during a wedding, Carlos pretends to offer himself for the act of Carmen's cousin, supermarket security guard and amateur hypnotist Pepe (Mota), but he instead crashes Pepe's performance as his idea of a joke. However, he ends up unexpectedly affected by the hypnosis, to the point of holding Pepe hostage with a knife for a moment while everybody believes he is still joking. From the next day onwards, Carlos starts having lapses of time where he shows a very different personality, behaving instead like a loving, charismatic and intelligent man. Shocked yet gradually delighted, Carmen welcomes this change, but she starts suspecting there is something sinister behind it when Carlos's second personality has brief but dangerous episodes of psychosis.

She enlists the aid of Pepe and his hypnotism teacher, odontologist Dr. Fumetti (Pou), and together discover the truth: Carlos had sleeping mediumnic abilities, and the failed hypnosis act caused a dead man's soul to forge a spiritual link with him, possessing him at times. After investigating further, Carmen and Pepe eventually find out the identity of the dead man, a dancing prodigy named Alberto "Tito" Cantero (Gutiérrez) who had schizophrenia and murdered his own mother before committing suicide in 1983. This is further proved in a club, in which Carlos dances spectacularly with Carmen to Steve Miller Band's "Abracadabra" song. Carmen, Pepe and Dr. Fumetti hold a séance through the body of a dying old man to try to convince Tito to leave Carlos alone, but the spirit refuses claiming to be in love with Carmen. The latter impulsively drives Dr. Fumetti away when he tries to destroy the spirit by killing the old man, which would have killed Carlos too.

Time passes, and Carmen is left conflicted about what to do, while the Tito-possessed Carlos becomes increasingly unhinged due to his constant psychotic visions of chimpanzees tormenting him. At his new job as a steward, Tito has a breakdown, and only the arrival of Carmen and Pepe impedes him from possibly murdering an entire wedding with a knife. In order to solve the situation once for all, Pepe pretends to be an entertainer and performs a hypnotism act for the guests, which he uses to send both Tito and Carmen to the depths of Carlos's mind. Here she finds the mental representations of both men, each pleading for her to allow them to take over the body, with Carlos promising to make up for his failure as a husband and father. She faces a difficult decision, but despite seemingly accepting Tito over Carlos, she stabs Tito with the mental representation of the knife, sending his soul to the afterlife for good. After waking up, she leaves silently the restaurant, implying she has decided to abandon Carlos and seek a better life.

Cast
 Maribel Verdú as Carmen
 Antonio de la Torre as Carlos
 José Mota as Pepe
 Josep Maria Pou as Dr. Fumetti
 Quim Gutiérrez as Tito

Production 
The film was produced by Arcadia Motion Pictures alongside Perséfone Films, Pegaso Pictures, Noodles Production and Films Distribution, in association with Atresmedia Cine and with the participation of Atresmedia and Movistar+.

See also 
 List of Spanish films of 2017
 List of French films of 2017

References

External links
 

2017 films
2017 fantasy films
2017 black comedy films
2017 comedy-drama films
Spanish fantasy films
Spanish black comedy films
Spanish comedy-drama films
French fantasy comedy-drama films
French black comedy films
2010s Spanish-language films
2010s Spanish films
Arcadia Motion Pictures films
Atresmedia Cine films
Films about schizophrenia
Films about spirit possession